Ilyodrilus is a genus of annelids belonging to the family Naididae.

Species:
 Ilyodrilus asiaticus
 Ilyodrilus coccineus
 Ilyodrilus frantzi

References

Naididae